Omorgus howdenorum is a species of hide beetle in the subfamily Omorginae.

References

howdenorum
Beetles described in 1986